Albert Russo (born 26 February 1943) is a Belgian bilingual (English and French) author of novels, short stories, essays and poems, as well as a photographer. His main themes are fighting racism of all stripes, and defending individual and collective rights, including ethnic, religious and gender rights.

Early life and education 
Son of an Italian Sephardic father, born in Rhodes, and of a British mother who grew up in Rhodesia, he lived with his family in Congo, Ruanda-Urundi, Rhodesia and traveled to South Africa during 17 years. After graduating from high school in Bujumbura, at the Athénée Interracial, learning four languages, French, English, Dutch and German, with a knowledge of vernacular Swahili, he pursues his studies at New York University, getting a Bachelor of Science degree in Business Administration, in 1964, minoring in psychology and economics. This is when he started writing his poems in English. In 1965 he spent a year in Heidelberg and obtained a degree in German culture and literature at Collegium Palatinum. That same year he settled in Milan (Italy) where he continued to write while working with his father in the family import-export firm.

Literary career 
His first novel, La Pointe du Diable, written in French, and dealing with apartheid, is published in Brussels, (Belgium) in 1973 and the following year he wins both the Prix Colette in Cannes (France) and the Prix de la Liberté in Paris. In 1975 he goes back to New York where he teaches languages to adults, meanwhile he pursues his writing mainly in English and publishes poems and short stories, contributing, both as writer and translator to various magazines, such as Confrontation, The Literary Review, The Poet, Atlas World Review, and Philadelphia Poets. He also translates film scripts for children's documentaries at UNICEF. In 1978 he went back to Europe and decided to live in Paris.

Translated in a dozen languages, Albert Russo has written more than 25 works, including novels, books of short stories and of poetry. Africa is one of his major themes. Mixed Blood (published first by Domhan Books in New York, then by Imago Press in Arizona) garnered the Best Fiction Award in 1985 by Volcano Review in California. Both Mixed Blood and Eclipse over lake Tanganyika were nominated for the 2001 e-books award at the Frankfurt International Book Fair. Among his other novels are Le Cap des Illusions (formerly entitled La Pointe du Diable) republished by Editions du Griot in Paris, France, his humorous Zapinette series (in both English and French), his large volume of short stories, fables and essays The Crowded World of Solitude, vol 1, started in New York in the late 1970s, as well as the bilingual books of poetry Futureyes, and the large volume of poems (40 years of writing) The Crowded World of Solitude, vol 2. He has also produced about 50 books of photography with and without poetic captions.

All his works, along with some manuscripts and literary letters by various authors, are to be found at the Archives and Museum of Belgian Literature in Brussels (Belgium). Mixed Blood has been the subject of the Capes degree at the Sorbonne University in Paris in the English department of literature. The Zapinette Vidéo series was also taught at the Catholic University of Paris to foreign students.

During the 1980s, having in common their Congolese experience, their love of and their interest for Africa, he befriends the Italian artist and philosopher Joseph Pace, founder in Paris of Filtranisme, a neo-existential philosophical and artistic current. In the 2000s he also befriended the poet, artist and photographer Adam Donaldson Powell, with whom he authored in 2009 Gaytude, a volume of poetry encompassing the gay experience on the five continents with photography by Albert Russo.

As a photographer he has garnered several prizes in the US, especially from National Indie-Excellence (winner and finalist), photo pursuit (formerly photo challenge), Gallery Photografica (silver medal). Some of his photos have been exhibited at the Musée de l'Elysée in Lausanne (Switzerland).

In 1996 he is a juror at the Neustadt International Prize for Literature, which often leads to the Nobel Prize for Literature. Some of the Neustadt candidates, laureates or jurors having obtained the Nobel Prize are: Elias Canetti, Wole Soyinka, José Saramago, Nadine Gordimer, Eugenio Montale, Claude Simon.

Albert Russo has had seven books translated into Italian, L'Amante di mio padre (2001), Sangue Misto (2008), Shalom Tower Syndrome (2008), Sotto il Picco de Diavolo (2012), Io, Hans, figlio di nazisti (2013) and Zapinette a Parigi (2013).

Bilingual writer, he freely discusses topics such as anti-racism, individual and collective freedoms, and LGBT freedoms.

2019 UNICEF Award for the body of his poetry

2020 Artavita certificate of excellence for his photos

Selected bibliography

Novels (in English and in French) 
 Eclipse over Lake Tanganyika, Domhan Books, USA, 2000, then Imago Press, 2007
 Mixed Blood, Domhan Books, USA, 2000, then Imago Press, USA, 2007
 Shalom Tower Syndrome, Xlibris, USA, 2007, then Paraguas, 2010
 Zany Zapinette New York, Domhan Books, USA, 2000
 Oh Zaperetta, Xlibris, USA, 2005
 The Benevolent American in the Heart of Darkness, Xlibris, USA, 2005
 The Black Ancestor, Imago Press, USA, 2009
 Zulu Zapy wins the Rainbow Nation, Cyberwit, India 2010; Poetry Printery, South Africa, 2010
 And there was David-Kanza, Imago Press, USA, 2011
 Gosh Zapinette (4 of the Series of 7 Books), Imago Press, USA 2012
 Mother beloved, Mamica mia Createspace/Amazon, USA 2013
 Ode to Mamica mia, Mother beloved, Createspace/Amazon, USA 2013
 ZAPINETTE’S BIBLE ODYSSEY continues in Japan, Mexico and the North Pole, series, KDP Amazon 2020– Award-Winning Finalist in the 2020 International Book Awards, in both the humor and fiction & novella categories
 MÉMOIRES D’UN FILS DE NAZIS, roman, KDP Amazon 2020
 ZAPINNÈT A PARI, romen en fransè fonétik, KDP Amazon 2020
 CURIOSITY / CABINET / DE CURIOSITÉS, photobook, KDP Amazon 2020
 Livre collectif: DES ITALIENS AU CONGO, AUX ITALIENS DU CONGO, l’Harmattan, 2020, avec étude de Sang Mêlé d’Albert Russo
 HOLYLAND ZAPINETTE, translated into Hebrew זאפי בארץ הקודש, Saar Publishing, Tel Aviv, 2019, KDP Amazon edition, 2020
 SPEAK TO ME MOTHER BELOVED, large book of poems and photos, l’Aleph, Sweden, 2019
 CALL ME CHAMELEON, a memoir of prose, poetry and photos, 1,113 page-long e-book, l’Aleph, Sweden, 2019,- 2019 Book Excellence Award Finalist
 UNDER THE SHIRTTAILS OF ALBERT RUSSO, biography by Adam Donaldson Powell, l’Aleph, Sweden, 2017
 GOSH SZAPINETTE! The first ever series of Global Humor, Cyberwit.net, 2016 – 2018 Book Excellence Award Honoree
 La série de 6 Zapinette et son Tonton homo, Editions Textes Gais, Paris, 2016 & 2015
 A RAINBOW NAMED TEL AVIV, photobook, KDP Amazon, 2015
 L’AMANT DE MON PÈRE – JOURNAL PARISIEN, Editions Textes Gais, Paris, 2015
 L’AMANT DE MON PÈRE – JOURNAL ROMAIN, Editions Textes Gais, Paris, 2015
 PRINCES AND GODS, novel, l’Aleph, Sweden, 2014
 EUR-AFRICAN EXILES, novel, l’Aleph, Sweden, 2014
 ADOPTED BY AN AMERICAN HOMOSEXUAL IN THE BELGIAN CONGO, l’Aleph, Sweden, 2014
 LÉODINE OF THE BELGIAN CONGO, novel, l’Aleph, Sweden, 2014
 SANDRO’S NOTEBOOK – EUR-AFRICAN EXILES Movie by Albert Russo, 90', Wildsound Festival, Canada, 2014
 זאפי בארץ – Holyland Zapinette translated into Hebrew by Isabella Arad .20 .2019, Saar publishing, Tel Aviv – הקודש

Novels (in Italian) 

 L’amante di mio padre, Edizioni Libreria Croce, 2001 
 Sangue misto, Roma, Coniglio Editore, 2008
 Sangue misto, Roma, Elliot Editore, 2016
 Shalom tower sindrome, Edizioni Libreria Croce, 2008
 Sotto il picco del diavolo, Roma, Edizioni Libreria Croce, 2012
 Io, Hanz, figlio di nazisti, Roma, Edizioni Libreria Croce, 2013
 Dopo il gay pride a Parigi, Zapinette viene rapita a New York, Edizioni Libreria Croce 2013 
 Zapinette la parigina, comics illustrato da Soizick Jaffre, Edizioni Libreria Croce
 Zapinette, la spaghettona nel paese di Mandela, Edizioni Libreria Croce 
 Zapy ZZZen in estremo Oriente Edizioni Libreria Croce 
 Zapinette Burqa-burquette va in Terra Santa, Edizioni Libreria Croce

Poetry books (English and French) 
 Futureyes / Dans la nuit bleu-fauve, Le Nouvel Athanor, Paris, 1992
 Painting the Tower of Babel, New Hope International, GB, 1996.
 Poetry and Peanuts, Cherrybite Publications, GB, 1997
 The Crowded World of Solitude, Volume 2, the collected poems, Xlibris, USA, 2005 (40 years of writing)
 Gaytude, a poetic journey around the world, Albert Russo and Adam Donaldson Powell, Xlibris, USA, 2009
 Boundaries of Exile / Conditions of Hope, Albert Russo and Martin Tucker, Confrontation Press (Long Island University, NY), 2009
 Embers under my skin, Imago Press (USA), 2012

Short stories, essays and literary criticism (English and French) 
 Venitian Threshold, Bone & Flesh Publications, USA, 1995.
 The Age of the pearl: the collected works of Albert Russo, vol. 1, Domhan Books, USA, 2000
 Unmasking hearts: the collected works of Albert Russo, vol. 2, Domhan Books, USA, 2000
 Beyond the great water: the collected works of Albert Russo, vol. 3, Domhan Books, USA, 2000
 The Crowded World of Solitude, Volume 1, the collected stories and essays, Xlibris, USA, 2005 (40 years of writing).
 Eclats de malachite, Editions Pierre Deméyère, Brussels, 1971.
 Mosaïque Newyorkaise, Editions de l’Athanor, Parigi, 1975.
 Le Règne du Caméléon, Imago Press (USA), 2012
 Crystals in a shock wave (the works of Albert Russo, spanning 40 years), Blurb Inc., USA, 2012 and CreateSpace, USA, 2012

Photography books (a choice) 
 Body glorious, Xlibris, USA, 2006.
 Italia Nostra, Xlibris, USA, 2007.
 Norway to Spitzberg, Blurb Inc., USA, 2008
 Senegal Live, Blurb Inc., USA, 2010
 Mermaids of the Baltic Sea, Blurb Inc., USA, 2011
 Seven living Splendors: Venice, Rome, Paris, New York, Tel Aviv, Singapore and Jerusalem, Createspace/Amazon, USA, 2013
 Oriental gems, Blurb Inc., USA, 2012
 Ode to Mamica mia, Mother beloved, Createspace/Amazon, USA, 2013
 RomaDiva, Xlibris, USA, 2004
 AfricaSoul, Xlibris, USA, 2005
 Chinese Puzzle chinois, Xlibris, USA, 2005
 In France, Xlibris, USA, 2005
 Sri Lanka / Serendib, Xlibris, USA, 2005
 Mexicana, Xlibris, USA, 2006
 Body glorious, Xlibris, USA, 2006.
 Albert Russo: A Poetic Biography, Volumes 1 & 2, Xlibris, USA, 2006 
 Sardinia, Xlibris, USA, 2006
 Rainbow nature, Xlibris, USA, 2006
 Saint-Malo with love, Xlibris, USA, 2006
 Brussels ride, Xlibris, USA, 2006
 Granada, Costa del Sol & Ronda, Xlibris, USA, 2006
 Pasion de Espana, Xlibris, USA, 2007
 Quirks/Eclats, Xlibris, USA, 2007
 Vienese kaleidoscope, Blurb Inc., USA, 2007
 City of wonder / city of lovers, New York / Paris, Xlibris, USA, 2007 
 New York at heart, Xlibris, USA, 2007
 Eilat, Petra & Tel Aviv, Blurb Inc., USA, 2008
 Sympjony in Hands major, Blurb Inc., USA, 2010
 Mermaids of the Baltic, Blurb Inc., USA, 2010
 Expressive Romans, Blurb Inc., USA, 2010
 China Forever, Blurb Inc., USA, 2010
 Garden Delights, Blurb Inc., USA, 2010
 Animal Kinship, Blurb Inc., USA, 2010
 Celestial Blues/Chants du ciel, Blurb Inc., USA, 2010
 France: Art, Humour & Nature, Blurb Inc., USA, 2010
 In the air, on the ground, and on the water, Blurb Inc., USA, 2010
 Rainbow Paris/ Arc-en-ciel, Blurb Inc., USA 2011
 Israel/Jordan/Palestine, Blurb Inc., USA, 2011
 Living Objects, Blurb Inc., USA, 2011
 Au Naturel / born naked, Createspace/Amazon, USA, 2012
 Fotoripples / 1, 2 & 3, Createspace/Amazon, USA, 2012
 A myriad tales, vol.1,2 3, Createspace/Amazon, USA, 2012
 Crystals in a shock wave, KDP/Amazon + Blurb Inc, USA, 2 editions, 2012 
 Embers under my skin, KDP/Amazon + Blurb Inc, 2 editions, USA, 2012 
 Venice, empress of the Seas, Burb Inc. 2012
 Israel & Palestine, Blurb Inc, USA 2012
 Mother beloved, Mamica mia, Createspace/Amazon, USA, 2013
 Rome, my sibling, my empress, Createspace/Amazon, USA, 2013
 Seven living Splendors, Createspace/Amazon, USA, 2013

Articles 
 Les Nouvelles littéraires, Art, de Philippe Guilhon, p. 11, no. 2330, 28 May 1972, Paris
 Le Soir, Georges Sion (de l’Académie Royale), p. 34, 3 May 1972, Brussels
 La Dépêche de Lubumbashi, 26 January 1972, Zaïre
 Jeune Afrique, p. 64, N.602, 22 July 1972, Paris
 Culture Française, p. 47, art. de Robert Cornevin, 1973, Paris
 Nice-Matin, l’annonce du Prix Colette, 9 October 1974, Nice
 Les Nouvelles littéraires, p. 14, art. de Robert Cornevin, 8 April 1974, Paris
 La Libre Belgique, 30 January 1974, Bruxelles
 Revue Zaïre, art. de Kanika Mwana Ngombo, p. 47, N.300, 6 May 1974, Kinshasa
 Tribune Juive, d’Odette Lang, p. 21, 7 July 1974, Paris
 La vie ouvrière, Ma/June 1974, art. de Serge Zeyons, Paris
 L’Afrique littéraire et artistique, art. de J.B., p. 60, 1974, Paris
 Bingo, revue africaine, art. de S. Nkamgnia, p. 62, no. 255, April 1975, Paris
 La Renaissance Le Bessin, art. de J. Fauchon, p. 6, 14 September 1979, Bayeux, France
 Libération, art. de Michel Cressole, p. 23, 6 September 1990, Paris
 L’Express, 10 September 1990, Paris
 Le Figaro Littéraire, art. de Régis St. Gilles, 8 October 1990, Paris
 La Liberté-dimanche, 25 November 1990, Lausanne, Switzerland
 Le Matin du Sahara et du Maghreb, 1990, Algiers, Algeria
 McNally, Bill. Amelia, Albert Russo's African Connection, pp. 52–55, 1991, Bakersfield, California, USA
 Club du Livre France Loisirs / Belgique Loisirs, p. 5, no. 26, 1992, Brussels and Paris
 Mensuel Littéraire et Poétique, art. de Pierre Halen, p. 25, no. 203, May 1992, Brussels
 Antonio Veneziani, L’amante di mio padre, recensione, 2001
 Gianfranco Franchi, Sangue Misto, recensione, Lankelot, 2008
 Gianfranco Franchi, Shalom Tower Sindrome, recensione, Lankelot, 2008
 Leggere Tutti, art. di Silvia Barbarotta, p. 50, Roma, no. 75, March 2013

References

External links 
 
 Profile on Poets and Writers
 His blog at the Times of Israel
 Profile on www.authorsden.com
 Profile on www.viewbug.com
 Profile on www.artavita.com
 Profile on Twitter
 Profile on Facebook

1943 births
People from Kamina
Belgian male poets
Living people
New York University Stern School of Business alumni